Naina Singh Chautala is an Indian politician from Jannayak Janata Party and a member of Haryana Legislative Assembly from Badhra. Previously she was the member of Indian National Lok Dal and represented Dabwali in Haryana Legislative Assembly. She is the wife of Ajay Singh Chautala and mother of Dushyant Chautala and Digvijay Chautala. She is the third and last daughter of Ch. Bhim Singh Godara and Smt. Kantadevi Godara.

She was one of the four MLAs who joined her son's party Jannayak Janta Party after a split in Indian National Lok Dal.

See also
 Devi Lal
 Dynastic politics of Haryana
 Dushyant Chautala

References

Haryana MLAs 2014–2019
Chautala family
1966 births
Indian Hindus
Living people
Indian National Lok Dal politicians
Jannayak Janta Party politicians
People from Sirsa, Haryana
Place of birth missing (living people)
21st-century Indian women politicians
21st-century Indian politicians
Haryana MLAs 2019–2024
Women members of the Haryana Legislative Assembly